Alan Melikdjanian (Russian: Алан Меликджанян; born April 13, 1980), known by the alias Captain Disillusion, is a Soviet-born American independent filmmaker and YouTuber. Melikdjanian has been active in the founding of video-sharing sites Openfilm and Filmnet.com, and is the creator of the webseries Captain Disillusion, which focuses on critical analysis of visual effects and video editing while promoting critical thinking and skepticism.

Early life
Melikdjanian was born to Soviet-era circus performer parents, and is of Armenian and Russian descent. His father, Vilen, was a particularly well-known performer. He toured the Soviet Union with his parents until age 6, where he would live with his grandmother while attending school. During summer, he would resume touring with his parents. In his youth, Melikdjanian would spend most of his free time trying to copy the styles of Disney animators.

His family defected to the United States in the late 1980s; he rejoined them two years later, attending the William H. Turner Technical Arts High School in Miami, where he studied video production and 3D animation. He graduated from the Miami International University of Art & Design with a Bachelor of Fine Arts degree in film production.

Career

FilmNet.com and Openfilm 
Melikdjanian was the co-founder and creative director of FilmNet.com, and was the co-founder and chief creative officer of Openfilm. Both were intended as alternatives to popular video-sharing site YouTube, but for serious amateur filmmakers who "don't want to place their work alongside YouTube's mediocrities."  Openfilm closed in August 2015.

"Captain Disillusion" YouTube Channel, 2007–present

The "Captain Disillusion" YouTube Channel has approximately 2.36 million subscribers and 230 million views. On the channel he debunks—amongst other things—viral and paranormal "hoax" videos, doing so humorously, and with a heavy focus on visual effects.  He edits his videos using various software programs beginning with Avid Media Composer followed by Adobe After Effects, Blender, and Da Vinci Resolve.

In his videos, Melikdjanian wears a vintage 1980s tracksuit, with the bottom half of his face being covered in metallic paint.

Melikdjanian described how he designed his superhero costume:

Format
Firstly, the Captain addresses the audience. A typical introduction to his videos is "Greetings, children, Captain Disillusion here." Secondly, he goes on to show a popular video, usually a paranormal or viral video which is "too good to be true" (often starting with humorous topics to set a lighthearted mood, and then using his wristband—a gift from James Randi—to lead him to talk about the real topic). Thirdly, he reviews the footage, utilizing his expertise in digital editing, to break down the video and show how the result was accomplished. He also likes to recreate effects from the videos he debunks, often incorporating this into episodes.

He ends each video by saying he has to go, usually to assist with something mundane happening elsewhere in the world. He then says his motto: "Love with your heart. Use your head for everything else." His videos often conclude with a humorous ending sequence, which occasionally relates with the preceding video.

DVD
In 2011, Melikdjanian released a DVD of his Captain Disillusion series, entitled Captain Disillusion – Fame Curve Collection. It contains the first 16 episodes remastered with optional commentary and additional bonus features. He debuted it at TAM9, and later made it available for purchase online.

Recognition
Melikdjanian's work has gained recognition from The Huffington Post, Kotaku, Russian TV International, Phil Plait, the James Randi Educational Foundation, Fortean Times, Home Media Magazine, and Sun Sentinel, among others. He has also received thanks from people for debunking videos they had shared.

Interviews

In 2008, during an interview for The Skeptics' Guide to the Universe, Melikdjanian describes Captain Disillusion as a YouTube web series that tackles paranormal and illusion videos uploaded by others on YouTube. He started this effort as a blog entry on Myspace but later saw these items as ready made scripts for short videos. He notes that Penn & Teller were instrumental to his current interest and eventually found the skeptical movement involved in similar work. He finds that his followers like to learn about the illusions. It is not his intent to spoil legitimate entertainment or a current performer's work. His intent in showing how video illusions are created is to clear up misconceptions. Melikdjanian describes the basis for Openfilm briefly, saying it "was formed for film makers. The goal is to provide higher quality product and a group of serious content creators."

During an interview for The Skeptic Zone, in 2010, Melikdjanian describes Captain Disillusion as a superhero. And in a following 2011 interview, he describes that his work as Captain Disillusion is done "in the maximum fun way possible". He describes his work with James Randi, Randi calling him to participate in The Amaz!ng Meeting and his video work with Randi in a later project. During an interview by Susan Gerbic for Skeptical Inquirer, he states "I think it's best to focus on what you know—something you're already an expert on outside of skepticism—and explore the ways in which it's connected to skepticism. With Captain Disillusion, I connected a random thing—visual effects—to skepticism in a way that people seem to find engaging. I'm sure that can be done with many other fields in different ways."

In a 2017 interview with Richard Saunders from The Skeptic Zone, Melikdjanian described the video effects editing process, saying, "You know, the tools change but the methods really don't. It's all about making things look questionable and kinda crappy and low quality and then you can pretty much get away with anything." In replying to a follow up question regarding believing what you see on the internet, he said, "When I started out, people just kinda believed everything. It was like shooting fish in a barrel, but these days, people are just really asking me 'is this fake?', 'is this fake?', 'is this fake?', and half the stuff they show me is just, you know, a juggler juggling a lot of balls. They can't conceive that that could be real. People just don't believe anything anymore. I guess that's good for me because I get to explain lots of stuff but I wish people could finally strike that balance where they're not too credulous but they also know not to just dismiss everything out of hand."

Credits

Filmography

Additional work
 Still Life (2009) (short), steadicam operator
 The Shift (2013) (thanks), starring Danny Glover

Television / Web series

Awards

References

External links

 
 
 Captain Disllusion on YouTube

1980 births
Living people
Film people from Riga
American film directors
21st-century American composers
American male child actors
American YouTubers
Soviet emigrants to the United States
American people of Russian descent
American people of Armenian descent
Skepticism
Comedy YouTubers
YouTube filmmakers
Shorty Award winners